Juan Carlos Blum (born June 7, 1994) is a Mexican professional stock car racing driver.

Career
After beginning his racing career in karts, Blum began competing in the NASCAR Mini Stock Series in his native Mexico in 2009; he posted five wins in the series, with a best finish in the standings of second in 2010. He moved to the United States to continue his racing career in 2011, driving for Revolution Racing in late model events in Virginia and the Carolinas; he also competed in a single race in the NASCAR Corona Series during the year, having made two starts in the series in 2010.

After the 2011 season Blum tested an ARCA Racing Series car at Daytona International Speedway; during 2012 he competed in the Corona Series, finishing 18th in points with a best finish of 9th. He also made his debut in ARCA competition, competing in two races with a best finish of 15th, and drove in three Nationwide Series events for Rick Ware Racing, finishing 26th in his series debut at Chicagoland Speedway.

In February 2013, it was announced that Blum would compete full-time in the Nationwide Series for Rick Ware Racing, driving the No. 15. Blum wound up competing in 10 races during the season, with a best finish of 26th at Phoenix International Raceway.

Motorsports career results

NASCAR
(key) (Bold – Pole position awarded by qualifying time. Italics – Pole position earned by points standings or practice time. * – Most laps led.)

Nationwide Series

ARCA Racing Series
(key) (Bold – Pole position awarded by qualifying time. Italics – Pole position earned by points standings or practice time. * – Most laps led.)

References

External links
 
 

Living people
1994 births
Sportspeople from Guadalajara, Jalisco
Mexican racing drivers
NASCAR drivers
ARCA Menards Series drivers